Eefting is a surname. Notable people with the surname include:

Fred Eefting (born 1959), Dutch swimmer
Roy Eefting (born 1989), Dutch road and track cyclist
 (born 1982), Dutch athlete